Padilla Municipality is a municipality in the Mexican state of Tamaulipas. After the flood at the Vicente Guerrero Dam in 1970, the seat was moved from Padilla to the town of Nuevo Padilla.

Padilla is known for being the place where the Mexican liberator and Emperor Agustín de Iturbide was executed by a firing squad. It is also the place where Manuel de Mier y Terán, a Mexican general, took his life with a sword. The town was established on 6 January 1749 by José de Escandón, then a Spanish Indian-fighter in New Spain and the founder and first governor of the colony of Nuevo Santander. The town was named after Maria Padilla, the wife of Juan Francisco de Güemes, the viceroy of New Spain. At the time of its establishment, more than 40 people from Hidalgo, Linares, and Río Blanco resided in the area. As of 2010, the municipality of Padilla has a population of 14,020.

However, the Tamaulipas State Civil Protection Coordination rejected the document presented by the CFE, saying the document was falsified.

References

External links
  Gobierno Municipal de Padilla

Municipalities of Tamaulipas